The Orchard of Lost Souls is a 2013 novel by the Somali-British author Nadifa Mohamed. It is set in Somalia on the eve of the civil war. Her second book, coming four years after her award-winning debut work Black Mamba Boy (2009), it was published by Simon & Schuster.

Reviewing The Orchard of Lost Souls in The Independent, Arifa Akbar said: "If Mohamed's first novel was about fathers and sons ... this one is essentially about mothers and daughters." Aminatta Forna wrote in The New York Times: "In both 'Black Mamba Boy' and 'The Orchard of Lost Souls,' Nadifa Mohamed — generationally at a remove from the events she describes — shows how the echo of war reverberates down the generations, and why every nation needs its storytellers: someone to, if not make sense of events, then order them so that sense may be drawn."

Awards
In 2014 The Orchard of Lost Souls won the Somerset Maugham Award and was longlisted for the Dylan Thomas Prize.

References

External links
Simon and Schuster - The Orchard of Losts Souls

2013 British novels
Somalia in fiction
Novels set in Africa
Simon & Schuster books